Elections to the Highland Council were held on 1 May 2003; the same day as elections to the Scottish Parliament and to the 31 other councils in Scotland. 80 councillors were elected from 80 wards using the plurality system (a.k.a. 'First Past the Post'). Independent councillors retained their status as the majority group, with councillors also being elected representing the Labour Party, Liberal Democrats, and Scottish National Party.

Overall result

Caithness

Sutherland

Ross & Cromarty

Skye & Lochalsh

Inverness

Nairn

Badenoch & Strathspey

Lochaber

 

 
 

 
 
 

 
 

 
 

 
 

 
 
 

 
 

2003
2003 Scottish local elections